Mosman Bay ferry wharf is located on Mosman Bay on the northern side of Sydney Harbour serving the Sydney suburb of Mosman. It is served by Sydney Ferries Mosman services operated by First Fleet class ferries.

History

The first regular ferry service was arranged by property developer Richard Harnett in the early 1870s. A tram service to the wharf commenced in March 1897. At the same and in anticipation of increased demand from a developing and increasingly prosperous Mosman area, Sydney Ferries Limited improved frequency of ferries from Circular Quay. In addition to Mosman Wharf, ferries on that route serviced Musgrave Street Wharf (now South Mosman) and Cremorne Wharf (renamed Old Cremorne) with the opening of the Cremorne Point wharf and its tram connection in 1911.

In 1900, Sydney Ferries Limited acquired a freehold over then wharf and completed a significant Edwardian-style expansion providing a new wharf, waiting rooms and shops.

In 1961, the pontoon sank, and the in 1960s, the Edwardian wharf was replaced with a modern style structure. On 26 March 2014, the wharf was closed for to replace the pontoon and gangway whilst the existing waterside structure was refurbished.

Services

Interchanges
Keolis Downer Northern Beaches operates one route to and from Mosman Bay wharf:
230: to Milsons Point

References

External links

Mosman Bay Wharf Transport for NSW (Archived 12 June 2019)
Mosman Bay Local Area Map Transport for NSW

Ferry wharves in Sydney